Yogan Santos (born 15 January 1985) is a Gibraltarian footballer who last played for Gibraltar Premier Division side Manchester 62 and the Gibraltar national team. He plays as a defender.

International career

Santos was first called up to the Gibraltar senior team in February 2014 for friendlies against Faroe Islands and Estonia on 1 and 5 March 2014. He made his international début with Gibraltar on 1 March 2014 in a 4-1 loss at home to the Faroe Islands. His second appearance came a 2-0 home loss to Estonia on 5 March. He played at left back in both games.

On 14 November 2014, he scored an own goal in Gibraltar's 4–0 defeat to Germany.

International statistics

.

References

External links

 
 
 
 
 

1985 births
Living people
Gibraltarian footballers
Gibraltar international footballers
Glacis United F.C. players
Manchester 62 F.C. players
Gibraltar Premier Division players
Association football defenders